The Catalan constitutions were the laws of the Principality of Catalonia promulgated by the Count of Barcelona and approved by the Catalan Courts. The Corts in Catalan have the same origin as courts in English (the sovereign's councillors or retinue) but instead meaning the legislature. The first constitutions were promulgated by the Corts of 1283. The last ones were promulgated by the Corts of 1705. They had pre-eminence over the other legal rules and could only be revoked by the Catalan Courts themselves. The compilations of the constitutions and other rights of Catalonia followed the Roman tradition of the Codex.

Origin: The Corts of Barcelona
The first compilation was prescribed by Ferdinand I of Aragon, and suggestion by the Corts of Barcelona from 1413. It spread in edition of the 1495, together with the Usages of Barcelona:
Usatges de Barcelona, Constitutions, Capitols, y Actes de Cort, y  leys de Cathalunya ("Usages of Barcelona, constitutions, chapters and acts of court and other laws of Catalonia")

The compilations agreed in the Corts of 1585 and of 1702 were published in three volumes:

Constitutions y altres drets de Cathalunya ("Constitutions and other rights of Catalonia")
Pragmaticas y altres drets de Cathalunya ("Pragmatics and other rights of Catalonia"
Constitutions y altres drets de Cathalunya superfluos, contraris y corregits ("Constitutions and other rights of Catalonia, superfluous, contrary, and corrected")

De jure abolition: Els Decrets de Nova Planta

Shortly after the end of the War of the Spanish Succession, Philip V of Spain issued the set of decrees known in Spanish as the Decretos de Nueva Planta and in Catalan as the Decrets de Nova Planta. This series of decrees abolished the separate laws of the territories that supported his rival to the throne, the Archduke Charles of Austria; this included all territories of the Crown of Aragon. The Decretos attempted to make Spain into a centralized state on the model of France, applying the laws of Castile to all of Spain. These acts were promulgated in Valencia and Aragon in 1707, and were extended in 1716 to Catalonia and the Balearic Islands (with the exception of Menorca, a British possession at the time).

Thus, the Catalan Constitutions were effectively abolished by the King's authority after his military victory, rather than through any legislative process within Catalonia itself. The change ignored the Catalan Constitution's own provisions for how they were to be amended or reformed.

Restoration promise: The Third Carlist War
During the Third Carlist War (1872–1876), the Carlist forces managed to occupy some cities in the Catalan interior. Isabel II was in exile and King Amadeo I had reigned since 1871, although he was not generally popular. The pretender Charles VII of Spain, grandson of Charles V of Spain (hence Carlist from Carlos, "Charles"), promised the Catalans, Valencians and Aragonese the return of their Charters or fueros (Catalan: furs) and the constitutions that Philip V had previously abolished.

The promise was never fulfilled, as the Carlist revolt did not succeed. Carlos María de los Dolores finally departed for France, 27 February 1876, the same day that Alfonso XII of Spain entered Pamplona.

See also
Principality of Catalonia
Parliament of Catalonia
Nueva Planta Decrees
Civil Code of Catalonia

References
 Constitucions de Catalunya del 1495 on Wikisource.
 Furs, capítols, provisions e actes de cort fets y atorgats per la S.C.R.M. del rey don Phelip nostre senyor, ara gloriosamente regnant. Monçó, 1626 ("Fueros, chapters, provisions and acts of court made and awarded by the S.C.R.M. of King Philip our lord, who reigns gloriously") on Wikisource.
 Constitutions y altres drets de Cathalunya, Barcelona, 1704 on Wikisource.
 Chapters of the Corts of Montsó digitalized, at the Spanish Office of Culture record image (fragment referent to the Consulate of the Sea.)

External links

 The demise of the catalan dynasty and the growing estrangement of the crown

1280s in law
1410s in law
1490s in law
1535 in law
1585 in law
1702 in law
Legal codes
Catalan law
Catalan symbols
Defunct constitutions
History of Catalonia
Principality of Catalonia
Legal history of Spain
Constitutions
1283 in Europe
1413 in Europe
1535 in Spain
1585 in Spain
1702 in Spain
1495 in Spain
13th-century establishments in Aragon
15th century in Aragon